A proof mass or test mass is a known quantity of mass used in a measuring instrument as a reference for the measurement of an unknown quantity.

A mass used to calibrate a weighing scale is sometimes called a calibration mass or calibration weight.

A proof mass that deforms a spring in an accelerometer is sometimes called the seismic mass. In a convective accelerometer, a fluid proof mass may be employed.

See also
 Calibration, checking or adjustment by comparison with a standard
 Control variable, the experimental element that is constant and unchanged throughout the course of a scientific investigation
 Test particle, an idealized model of an object in which all physical properties are assumed to be negligible, except for the property being studied

References

Accelerometers
Measurement
Mass
Units of mass